Grievances is the fourth studio album by English experimental band Rolo Tomassi. The album was released on 1 June 2015 through Holy Roar Records and Ipecac Recordings.

Track listing

References 

2015 albums
Rolo Tomassi albums